E Luxo So is the fifth studio album by the Virginian post-rock band Labradford, released on July 13, 1999, by Blast First and Kranky. The titles of the album's six songs are made up of the recording and production credits.  Track 4, "By Chris Johnston, Craig Markva, Jamie Evans," was used in several episodes of the HBO miniseries The Young Pope.

Track listing

Personnel 
Adapted from the E Luxo So liner notes.

Labradford
 Carter Brown – keyboards
 Robert Donne – bass guitar
 Mark Nelson – vocals, guitar
Additional musicians
 Jamie Evans – violin
 Chris Johnston – violin
 Craig Markva – violin
 Jonathan Morken – violin
 Peter Neff – Hammered dulcimer

Production and additional personnel
 Bryan Hoffa – assistant engineering
 Claire Lewis – production
 John Morand – recording, mixing
 Leta O'Steen – photography
 John Piper – design

Release history

References

External links 
 

1999 albums
Labradford albums
Blast First albums
Kranky albums